Richard Migliore (born March 14, 1964, in Babylon, New York) is a retired American jockey. He now works as a racing analyst for XBTV.  He was nicknamed "The Mig," which is a type of Russian fighter jet, for his tenacious style of riding. He lives with his wife, Carmela, and children in Millbrook, New York.

Early life
Migliore grew up in Sheepshead Bay, Brooklyn. When he was 11, his family moved into a bigger house in Bay Shore, New York. On a bike ride as a child, Migliore drove down a road that ended at a dressage horse farm called Hunting Hollow Farm, which was managed by Hugh Cassidy.  Cassidy gave Migliore his first chance to work with horses and his first riding lessons. Before he was 13 years old, Migliore and a few friends bought ponies to start a pony-ride business. The pony rides turned into pony racing on the athletic fields of the Brentwood schools. They trained the ponies themselves and rode them, charging a $5 entry fee for others who raced. The day Migliore saw Willie Shoemaker win the Marlboro Cup aboard Forego on TV, he decided to be a jockey.   Migliore grew to be only 5'4” and weigh 112 pounds.

Riding career
Trainer Stephen A. DiMauro gave him his first job at a track and taught how to ride a race horse.

His first mount was on September 29, 1980, and his first win was less than a month later aboard Good Grip at Meadowlands Racetrack. In 1981, Migliore won the Eclipse Award as the leading apprentice jockey at the age of 17.

On May 30, 1988, Migliore suffered a near-fatal neck injury when he was thrown from Madam Alydar at Belmont Park. The accident was featured on the television series Rescue 911 on March 24, 1992, on CBS. In July 1999, he seriously fractured his right arm in another spill at Belmont and was out of the races for six months.

Two days before the Breeders' Cup run at Lone Star Park in Texas, his horse, Paulina, fell on him. He rode in the Sprint anyway, mounted on Bwana Charlie, and in the Mile on Artie Schiller. As he said, "My desire superseded my logic." Later he found he had a broken wrist, broken ribs and a broken pelvis. Sidelined for two months, he took up yoga, which he grew to love. As he says, "It even keeps my weight down."

Migliore was the recipient of the Eddie Arcaro Award from the New York Turf Writers Association as outstanding jockey in 1981 and 1985. He won the 2003 Mike Venezia Memorial Award from the New York Racing Association for "extraordinary sportsmanship and citizenship." Also that year, Migliore was honored at the 2003 Thurman Munson Awards Dinner by the Association for the Help of Retarded Children. In 2005, he again won the New York Thoroughbred Association Jockey of the Year title, riding the New York-bred winners of 58 races and winning $2,246,398.

In 2005, he won the Aqueduct Racetrack spring meet. His 4,000th career win occurred on February 4, 2005. He won twice that day, once on Hurricane Erica and the second time on Benjamin Baby. Migliore became the 18th active jockey to reach that milestone and the 43rd in U.S. history to win that many races. In October 2006, Migliore announced his move to the California tracks after a career spent on the East Coast. On November 15, he rode his first mount at Hollywood Park Racetrack. On February 23, 2008, Migliore won the George Woolf Memorial Jockey Award. In the summer of 2008, Migliore announced he would be returning to the East Coast for the  Saratoga meet. At the end of the Saratoga meet, Migliore relocated to New York.

On October 25, 2008, at Santa Anita Park, Migliore won his first Breeders' Cup race, the Breeders' Cup Turf Sprint on Desert Code.

On May 4, 2010, he underwent an operation in which two plates and eight screws were inserted into his neck due to a fall from his mount, Honest Wildcat, at Aqueduct on January 23, 2010. During a press conference held at Belmont Racetrack before the draw for the Belmont Stakes in June, Migliore announced his retirement. He won 4,450 races, including 362 stakes and 25 Grade 1 events.

"It's no big surprise why we're here, my career as a jockey is over," he said. "It's not by choice. I was in the doctor's office on Wednesday of last week and he assured me that I would never ride another Thoroughbred again. He works on many NFL players and said if you have a level two fusion, you have to retire. I have a level four fusion."

Broadcast career

In late 2010, shortly after retiring from the saddle, Migliore joined HRTV as an analyst where he appears on number of shows, including "Pursuit of the Cup" and "Pursuit of the Crown". He contributed reports from the Breeders' Cup, and the Triple Crown races. In 2014, Migliore joined Fox Sports 1 The Jockey Club Tour on FOX racing series as the racing analyst before moving on to the New York Racing Association, serving as broadcast analyst and racing office associate.

Migliore joined the XBTV team in 2017 and presently works as an East Coast analyst, providing handicapping insight and interviews.

Year-end charts

References

External links
NTRA bio
Profile

1964 births
Eclipse Award winners
Living people
American jockeys
People from Babylon, New York
People from Bay Shore, New York
American horse racing commentators
People from Dutchess County, New York
People from Sheepshead Bay, Brooklyn